Heliopolis ( "New Egypt") was an early 20th Century suburb outside Cairo, Egypt, which has since merged with Cairo and is administratively divided into the districts of Masr al-Gadida and al-Nozha in the Eastern Area.

Named after the ancient Egyptian city of Heliopolis where its ruins have been found nearby in present day Ain Shams, modern Heliopolis was established in 1905 by the Heliopolis Oasis Company headed by the Belgian industrialist Édouard Empain and by Boghos Nubar, son of the Egyptian Prime Minister Nubar Pasha.

The population in January 2022 of Masr al-Gadida was estimated to be 142,017 and in al-Nozha was 244,869 people.

History 

   

Édouard Louis Joseph, 1st Baron Empain visited Egypt in January 1904 to rescue one of the projects of his company S.A. des Chemins de Fer de la Basse-Egypte; the construction of a railway line linking Mansourah (on the Nile river) to Matariya (on the far side of Lake Manzala from Port Said).

In 1906, Empain established the Cairo Electric Railways and Heliopolis Oases Company, which bought 2500 ha (6177 acres) of desert around 10km to the northeast of Cairo to build a semi-automous garden city of Heliopolis.

The new town represented the first large-scale attempt to promote its own architecture, known now as the Heliopolis style. It was designed as a "city of luxury and leisure", with broad avenues and equipped with all conveniences and infrastructure: water, drains, electricity, hotel facilities, such as the Heliopolis Palace Hotel and Heliopolis House, and recreational amenities including a golf course, racetrack and park. In addition, there was housing for rent, offered in a range of innovative designs targeting specific social classes with detached and terraced villas, apartment buildings, tenement blocks with balcony access and workers' bungalows.

While Heliopolis had features that were fundamentally different from the colonial planning in other African and Asian countries, it was an undertaking that could not have been more colonial. The project was the expression of a dream of one man, the Belgian Edouard Empain, and the buildings were designed by Belgian, French and British architects and, in the beginning, built with materials brought from these countries. And athough there is no ‘cordon sanitaire’, there are some more implicit structures that made a more subtle segregation in the city possible.

Baron Empain's palace was designed by Alexander Marcel, a French architect and a member of the French Institute,  according to a Neo Hindu style modelled on Angkor Wat in Cambodia and the Hindu temples of Orissa. The neighborhood had some of the wealthiest Egyptian residences; on the left facing Avenue Baron was the Arabesque palace of Boghos and Marie Nubar Pasha, now a military headquarters, and diagonally opposite stands the former residence of Sultan Hussein Kamel, who reigned over Egypt between 1914 and 1917, and today, it is a presidential guest house.

The Heliopolis War Cemetery on Nabil el Wakkad street contains the Port Tewfik Memorial, a memorial to over 4000 soldiers of the British Indian Army who fell in the First World War, which was originally in Port Tewfik in Suez, but was relocated to Heliopolis after its destruction in the 1970s.

Modern Heliopolis was originally filled primarily with aristocratic Egyptians, as well as some European nationals. Unlike other modern Cairene suburbs around the start of the 20th century, Heliopolis had a significantly larger percentage of Egyptian citizen residents. After the 1952 revolution led by Nasser, it became home to much of Cairo's educated middle class. As Cairo has expanded, the once large distance between Heliopolis and Cairo has vanished and it is now well inside the city. Because of the large growth in population, the original gardens that filled the city have mostly been built over.

Administrative divisions and population 
Heliopolis today is administratively divided into the districts of Masr al-Gadida and al-Nozha in the Eastern Area of Cairo.

Masr al-Gadia had a population of 134,116 in 2017 divided into four shiakhas:

Al-Nozha had 231,241 people in 2017 over its four shiakhas:

Note: The remaining shiakhas on the Nozha map are now part of Shorouk and Badr new cities under the jurisdiction of the New Urban Communities Authority.

Religious buildings
The are a number of places of worship in the district for all three Abrahamic religions and many of their sects, reflecting the cosmopolitan intent of the early 20th Century colonial real estate project. Our Lady of Heliopolis Co-Cathedral is a Roman Catholic church on Al-Ahram Street and a famous landmark, and the burial place of Heliopolis' founder Baron Empain. Since 1951, Heliopolis was the seat of the Latin Catholic Apostolic Vicariate of Heliopolis (founded as Apostolic Prefecture of the Nile Delta) until its title was merged in 1987 into the Apostolic Vicariate of Alexandria of Egypt. Its Marian former Our Lady cathedral remains a Co-cathedral. Other churches include the Saint Mark Coptic Orthodox Church, the Saint George Coptic Orthodox Church, the Saint-Rita Maronite Church, Theotokos Greek Orthodox Church, Sainte Therese Armenian Catholic Church.

There is also the Vitali Madjar Synagogue on al-Masallah Street. A large number of mosques now populate Heliopolis, though initially there was only one, the Mosque on Midan al-Game' next to the 'native quarter' where the workers originally lived.

Recreational facilities 

Heliopolis contains recreational places, as it was initially established to offer its residents and visitors rest and relaxation. Heliopolis club is one of the most luxurious sporting clubs in Egypt. It was established along with Heliopolis in 1905. From 1911 until 1915, Heliopolis had Luna Park, Africa's first amusement park (the grounds were converted into an Australian field hospital just after the onset of World War I).

The Merryland is also a famous recreational park; it contains a lake and was at the height of its elegance in the 1960s and 70s. It now contains a small amusement park. Other sporting clubs include El Shams Club (biggest in size and number of members), Heliolido club, El-Ghaba club, El-Tayaran club and others.

Heliopolis contains modern cafes (including Harris, Starbucks, Cilantro, Costa Coffee, and Beanos) and restaurants along with some Egyptian traditional ones. Some bars and nightclubs can be found. Tens of cinemas can be found in Heliopolis and its extension, Madinet nasr (Nasr City), Normandy Cinema in Al-Ahram street, Cinema Roxy, Cinema Heliopolis along with the new cinemas in Horia Mall and City Stars, one of the best-known shopping malls in Egypt.

Political importance 

Heliopolis gained a special political and military importance in Egypt and the Middle East in recent decades. The Egyptian Military headquarters and the Egyptian Air Force headquarters are there. The Almaza Military Airbase is very close to Heliopolis. Heliopolis was the residence of the Egyptian ex-president Mohamed Hosni Mubarak. In 1981, the site of Heliopolis Palace Hotel became the Egyptian Republican Palace and the president's office.

The present and the future 
In contrast with its initial establishment as a quiet suburb, Heliopolis now is considered a main part of Cairo. It is home to celebrities, football players, politicians and wealthy families. The numbers of residents have doubled several times since 1922. A tram system used to serve Heliopolis and parts of the surrounding area but it has been almost entirely closed, and partly removed, in 2015. Heliopolis was already integrated into the existing underground system to link it to other pivotal residential areas all around Cairo. Several major areas of Heliopolis such as El-Ahram street, El-Marghany street and Fair Zone are already formal destinations in the newly developed Metro stations belonging to Line 3, with a plan to extend the line to include other stations such as Nozha and Cairo International Airport. The Heliopolis/Airport extensions of Line 3 are expected to be completed by the end of 2018. In 2019 and 2020, major changes to the infrastructure have occurred including widening several streets and building several bridges to ease traffic (mainly instead of major squares). This is also part of a bigger plan to link the New Administrative Capital to the East to the city of Cairo.

Education 

International schools:
 Lycée La Liberté Héliopolis
 Saint Fatima School

Notable people 
 Jani Christou (1926–1970), Greek composer
 Charles Ayrout
 Henry Habib Ayrout (1907–1969)

See also 

 Cairo Electric Railways and Heliopolis Oases Company
 Ancient Heliopolis
 Heliopolis style: the architectural style of Heliopolis
 New Heliopolis (suburb)

References

Further reading 
 
 
 
 Once, We Hosted Kings, by Samir Raafat, Egypt Today, June 2005.
 Van Loo, Anne & Bruwier, Marie-Cécile (eds.), Héliopolis, Brussels: Fonds Mercator, 2010, 229 p., richly illustrated .

External links 

 

History of Cairo
Armenian diaspora communities
Districts of Greater Cairo
Populated places established in 1905